Steinar Gundersen (born 16 September 1970) is a guitarist from the small village of Oklungen, Norway. He plays live with the black metal band Satyricon as well as also having played lead guitar in the progressive metal band Spiral Architect. Gundersen has recently started a band called System:obscure, together with Bugge Wesseltoft.

Bands involved in

King's Quest (1988-1992)
Spiral Architect (1992-)
Lunaris (1999-2002)
Satyricon (1999-)
Sarke (2009-)
ICS Vortex (As bass player, 2011-)

References

Norwegian guitarists
Norwegian male guitarists
Living people
1970 births
Satyricon (band) members